Myrciaria glomerata, commonly known as  (red cabeludinha) or  (scarlet cabeluda), is a species of plant in the family Myrtaceae. It is an evergreen shrub or small tree, endemic to the north and east of Brazil. Myrciaria glomerata has historically been used to incorrectly describe Myrciaria glazioviana.

Description 

Myrciaria glomerata grows up to 8 metres tall, and produces edible red fruits around 20mm in diameter. The fruit pulp is slightly yellow and rich in Vitamin C.

The leaves of Myrciaria glomerata are simple, opposite, lanceolate, pinnate and chartaceous. They are between 3 and 4cm wide, and between 9 and 11cm long. The top of the leaves are bright dark green, and the underside is light green and very hairy. The hairyness of Myrciaria glomerata is helpful for the identification of this species.

References

glomerata
Crops originating from the Americas
Tropical fruit
Flora of South America
Fruits originating in South America
Cauliflory
Fruit trees
Berries